Kiwaia contraria is a moth in the family Gelechiidae. It was described by Alfred Philpott in 1930. It is found in New Zealand.

References

Kiwaia
Moths described in 1930
Moths of New Zealand
Endemic fauna of New Zealand
Endemic moths of New Zealand